Sergio Campano Franco (born 1 June 1987 in Badajoz), aka Sota, is a Spanish footballer who plays as a midfielder (winger or playmaker).

Career
Players formed in the ranks of Don Bosco, was signed by the historic CD Badajoz in his city. He devoted fan favorite as only 19 years and were several first division clubs who followed in his footsteps, to its equipment subsidiary, without any concrete reached.

After a short time in Los Barrios, signed by another historic region, where Mérida UD had a great season scoring 8 goals. Stop by the Sporting Villanueva winning promotion to the 2nd B. After a successful year in which he scored 12 goals Sanvicenteño, signed by Major League Milsami Moldovan, inclusive was convocate for Europa League.

The experience is short for changes in the sports direction, a week after signing. This returns to his hometown, playing in the Jerez CF, which makes another great year, scoring 9 goals and being one of the best players of the season.

In May 2013 signed by the Thunder Bay Chill (Canada) and plays in the Premier Development League USA, gets to play the final of USA. He's awarded Rookie of Year 2013. Scored 8 goals and becomes one of the best assistants in the championship.

After his American success he called the attention of several European clubs, finally signing with Lokomotiv Sofia, a club from Bulgaria that acquired his services. His debut in the competition was on September 21, against Cherno More, entering in the 47th minute. He scored his first goal in a Bulgarian competition in a Cup match, against Slavia Sofia the day of 6 November 2013.

References

External links

tbnewswatch.com at Tb News Watch
chroniclejournal.com at Chronicle Journal
pdl.uslsoccer.com at PDL Official Website
elperiodicoextremadura.com at El Periodico Extremadura
hoy.es at Hoy
es.uefa.com at FIFA
netnewsledger.com at Netnewsledger

1987 births
Living people
Spanish footballers
Association football midfielders
First Professional Football League (Bulgaria) players
CD Badajoz players
Mérida UD footballers
FC Lokomotiv 1929 Sofia players
Expatriate footballers in Bulgaria
Thunder Bay Chill players